Morozko may refer to:

Father Frost (fairy tale), a Russian folk fairy tale
Morozko (1924 film), based on the fairy tale
Jack Frost (1964 film), based on the fairy tale
Luka Morozko, Russian Cossack, leader of the first exploration of Kamchatka Peninsula (1695-1696)
Morozko, a Russian superhero from DC Comics